The Will Rogers Memorial Center (WRMC) is an  American public entertainment, sports and livestock complex located in Fort Worth, Texas. It is named for American humorist and writer Will Rogers. It is a popular location for the hosting of specialized equestrian and livestock shows, including the annual Fort Worth Stock Show, the annual National Reined Cow Horse Association Snaffle Bit Futurity, the World Championship Paint Horse Show, and 3 major events of the National Cutting Horse Association each year. It is also the former home of the Fort Worth Texans ice hockey team, and it hosted a PBR Bud Light Cup Series (later Built Ford Tough Series) event annually from 1995 to 2004. Events at the WRMC attract over 2 million visitors annually. The complex contains the following facilities:

 Will Rogers Coliseum (5,652 seats)
 Will Rogers Auditorium (2,856 seats)
 Will Rogers Equestrian Center
 Amon G. Carter Jr. Exhibits Hall
 James L. & Eunice West Arena
 John Justin Arena
 W. R. Watt Arena

The Memorial Center was built in 1936 and designed by architect Wyatt C. Hedrick, who employed the Moderne (Art Deco) style. Also in 1936 Amon G. Carter commissioned Electra Waggoner Biggs to create the statue Riding into the Sunset, a tribute to Will Rogers and his horse Soapsuds. Over a decade later, in 1947, the work was unveiled at the Center. On March 22, 2016, the complex was placed on the National Register of Historic Places.

The Dickies Arena, which opened in November 2019, is located adjacent to the complex. The new 14,000-seat venue will host the Fort Worth Stock Show rodeos, concerts and early-round games in the 2022 NCAA Division I men's basketball tournament; however, Will Rogers Memorial Coliseum will continue to operate as an equestrian arena in Fort Worth.

Gallery

See also

National Register of Historic Places listings in Tarrant County, Texas

References

External links

Will Rogers Memorial Center
Will Rogers Memorial Center Calendar of Events

Architecture in Fort Worth: Will Rogers Auditorium, Coliseum, & Pioneer Tower

Art Deco architecture in Texas
Equestrian venues in the United States
Indoor ice hockey venues in the United States
Sports venues in Fort Worth, Texas
Buildings and structures completed in 1936
TCU Horned Frogs basketball
Event venues on the National Register of Historic Places in Texas
National Register of Historic Places in Fort Worth, Texas
Sports venues on the National Register of Historic Places in Texas
College basketball venues in the United States
Basketball venues in Texas
Rodeo venues in the United States
Cultural depictions of Will Rogers